The 10.5 cm SK L/45 (Schnelladekanone Länge 45, quick-loading cannon with a barrel length of 45 calibers) was a German naval gun that was used in World War I and World War II and was the successor of the older 10.5 cm SK L/40 naval gun.

Description

It used a horizontal sliding-block breech design.

Naval use

Gallery

See also
 List of naval guns

Weapons of comparable role, performance and era
 QF 4 inch Mk V naval gun Approximate British equivalent firing slightly lighter shell
 4"/50 caliber gun Approximate US equivalent, firing slightly lighter shell at higher velocity

References

Bibliography

External links
 SK L/45 at Navweaps.com

105 mm artillery
Naval guns of Germany